The R738 road is a regional road in Ireland which links Bridgetown with the N25 in County Wexford. 

The road passes through the village of Taghmon.

See also 

 Roads in Ireland
 National primary road
 National secondary road

References 

Regional roads in the Republic of Ireland

Roads in County Wexford